is railway station on the Kyūdai Main Line operated by JR Kyushu in Kurume, Fukuoka Prefecture, Japan.

Lines 
Only local trains on the line stop at the station.

Layout 
The station consists of two side platforms serving two tracks at grade. A siding branches off track 1. The station building is a wooden structure of traditional Japanese design. The ticket window is unstaffed and the building serves only to house a waiting area. A Sugoca card reader is available. Access to the opposite side platform is by means of a footbridge.

Adjacent stations

History
Zendōji was opened on the same day as one of several intermediate stations on the track. With the privatization of Japanese National Railways (JNR), the successor of JGR, on 1 April 1987, JR Kyushu took over control of the station.

Passenger statistics
In fiscal 2015, there were 110,000 boarding passengers (in rounded thousands), giving a daily average of 301 passengers.

See also 

 List of railway stations in Japan

References

External links
Zendōji (JR Kyushu)

Railway stations in Fukuoka Prefecture
Railway stations in Japan opened in 1928